The Red Kimono (spelled as "The Red Kimona" in the opening credits) is a 1925 American silent drama film about prostitution produced by Dorothy Davenport (billed as Mrs. Wallace Reid) and starring Priscilla Bonner. This is the debut film of Director Walter Lang.
[[File:The Red Kimono ad in Motion Picture News, September-October 1925 (page 368 crop).jpg|thumb|349x349px|The Red Kimono advertisement in Motion Picture News, 1925]]
The title comes from a red-colored dress shown through the film, meant to symbolize the main character's occupation as a "scarlet woman" (a prostitute).

Plot

Gabrielle Darley shoots Howard Blaine in the back as he is buying a wedding ring, then asks pardon and expresses love to his corpse as she awaits arrest. At her trial she narrates her story. Blaine courted and claimed he would marry her, and she went with him to New Orleans. Blaine took her to a sleazy house where a mirror vision of herself in bridal attire gave way to a red dress, indicating she was entering prostitution. For love of Blaine she spent several miserable years servicing men he sent.

The prosecutor suggests she shot Blaine in jealousy that he was going to marry another; she acknowledges this and says he was buying the ring with money she herself earned. Women in the courtroom cry. The all-male jury finds her not guilty.

Gabrielle says she wants to redeem herself by helping people, and drops the red dress on the floor. Beverly Fontaine, a society matron who gets publicity by taking up reformed criminals, invites her to live at her house. There, she is displayed at parties for Beverly's friends and tormented by questions about her prostitution. Chauffeur Terrance O'Day takes her on a date to an amusement park, and she realizes that there is a good kind of man she has never encountered before.

Beverly tires of her and goes on a trip with Terrance driving, leaving Gabrielle to train as a nurse. The superintendent recognizes her and throws her out. She loses her job as a maid when she gets upset at seeing her defense attorney's wife wearing the ring she had had to give him as her fee. Starving and desperate, she telegraphs her friend Clara in the New Orleans brothel to send her the train fare to return and take up her old profession.

The telegraph operator is a friend of Terrance's, and tells him of this. Terrance throws up his job and commandeers Beverly's car to drive to the train station to stop Gabrielle, but is too late. He catches the next train, and, in New Orleans, takes a taxi to the address on the telegram. Meanwhile Gabrielle has been attacked by a brute and hit by a car as she runs from him. Terrance sees the accident without realizing it is she. Hearing from Clara that she has not shown up yet, he hangs around the street looking for her for days.

Recovering in hospital, Gabrielle hears that, due the flu pandemic and U.S. entering World War I, they desperately need nurses and helpers. She is hired, and is scrubbing the hospital floor when Terrance enters in uniform, having enlisted as an ambulance driver. He asks her to marry him before he goes overseas. She declares her love but postpones their marriage till he comes back and she has worked longer and become worthy of a happy life with him.

A woman who has been keeping an album of clippings about Gabrielle, who seems to be Beverly's maid, tells us that this happy life was attained for these two. But Gabrielle is only one of many women in this terrible situation, and it is up to all women to help their unfortunate sisters.

Cast

Production
The film is notable today for being one of the few independent productions produced and written by women. This is the third of Davenport's "social conscience" releases, preceded by Human Wreckage (1923) on the topic of drug addiction (released five months after Wallace Reid's death from morphine), and Broken Laws (1924) about excessive mother-love.

The film is based on a real case of prostitution that took place in New Orleans in 1917. This film, billing itself as a true story, used the real name of the woman played by Priscilla Bonner who as a consequence sued producer Dorothy Davenport and won. The case, Melvin v Reid has been cited recently in the emerging "right to be forgotten" cases around the world as an early example of one's right to leave a past one wishes to forget. In the ruling of the California Appellate Court (Melvin v. Reid, 112 Cal.App. 285, 297 P. 91 (1931)) the Court stated, "any person living a life of rectitude has that right to happiness which includes a freedom from unnecessary attacks on his character, social standing or reputation."

As with Davenport's earlier Human Wreckage'' in 1924, this film was banned in the United Kingdom by the British Board of Film Censors in 1926. In the 1920s, the film was also banned in the city of Chicago.

Preservation status
A copy of this film is preserved at the Library of Congress. A DVD edition was released in the early 2000s.

References

External links

The Red Kimono at TCMDB

1925 films
1925 drama films
Silent American drama films
American silent feature films
Films directed by Walter Lang
American black-and-white films
1920s American films